Stefanos Manos (born 1939) is a Greek politician, former member of the Hellenic Parliament, and a former government minister.

Career
His political career started in the New Democracy party, for which he became a Member of Parliament in 1977. During the 1980s he would be the unpopular forerunner of Greek privatization. In April 1999, he formed his own party, The Liberals, but following its unsuccessful performance in the elections held in June for the European parliament (1,62%), he returned to the Hellenic Parliament firstly in 2000 as MP in co-operation with the major party of New Democracy, and again in the 2004 elections as independent by the statewide list but surprisingly on a rival PASOK ticket.

After he suspended his Liberals' operation in 2002, he established in 2009 his new own party, Drassi, which he continues to lead. Heading Drassi, he took part in the 2009 European parliament election (0,76%). In May 2012, Drassi merged with the newly formed party Recreate Greece for the 2012 elections.

Manos is a notable critic of profligate government spending and waste. He is famous for saying in 1992, while he was Greek finance minister, that "it would be cheaper for Greece to send every rail passenger to their destination by taxi", a quote which was used by Michael Lewis in his book Boomerang: Travels in the New Third World.

References

|-

|-

1939 births
Finance ministers of Greece
Greek MPs 1977–1981
Greek MPs 1981–1985
Greek MPs 1985–1989
Greek MPs 1989 (June–November)
Greek MPs 1990–1993
Greek MPs 2004–2007
Harvard University alumni
Independent politicians in Greece
Living people
New Democracy (Greece) politicians
Politicians from Athens
ETH Zurich alumni